The Parish Church of Santiago do Iguape is a Roman Catholic church in the Iguape district of Cachoeira, Bahia, Brazil. Its construction began in the early 19th century and replaced an earlier church structure that fell into ruin. The church was listed as a historic structure by National Institute of Historic and Artistic Heritage (IPHAN) in 1960.

History

The Jesuits traveled up the Paraguacu River from Salvador in approximately 1561 and founded a small settlement. It is now known as the Iguape district of Cachoeira. The church complex built by the Jesuits fell into ruin; the present structure dates to the first half of the 19th century.

Location

The Parish Church of Santiago do Iguape is located on the Iguape inlet, sometimes called a lake, of the Paraguaçu River. The facade of the church and its entrance faces the river. The rear of the church faces the community of Iguape and lacks an entrance.

Structure

The Parish Church of Santiago do Iguape was constructed of mixed masonry of stone and brick. Its frontispiece is "extremely elegant" and is in the rococo Dona Maria I style. It is divided by sandstone pilasters, five portals superimposed by five windows at the choir level. The portals and windows are framed in lioz stone imported from Portugal; they have elaborate garland decoration borders. The facade is surmounted by an ornate baroque-style pediment. The church has two bell towers with gables at each side of the pediment. The bell gables have bulbous towers covered in glazed china fragments and azulejos, a feature found in numerous churches in Salvador and Recôncavo region.

The east, west, and rear facades of the church were never completed and lack any ornamentation.

Interior

The interior of the church has a rectangular plan with a single nave. It has two side aisles superposed by tribunes and a transversal sacristy; these are features common to churches of the period.

The interior has few decorative features and is considered unfinished. The chancel arch, balconies of the tribunes, and presbytery have simple ashlar facings; a lavabo is located in the sacristy. The chancel has semi-industrial tiles imported from Portugal in blue and white.

Protected status

The Parish Church of Santiago do Iguape was listed as a historic structure by the National Institute of Historic and Artistic Heritage in 1960. It was listed in the Book of Historical Works no. 575.

References

Baroque church buildings in Brazil
Roman Catholic churches in Bahia
17th-century Roman Catholic church buildings in Brazil
National heritage sites of Bahia
Portuguese colonial architecture in Brazil
1709 establishments in the Portuguese Empire